Robby Cruz Celiz (born September 7, 1988) is a Filipino professional basketball player for the Davao Occidental Tigers of the Pilipinas Super League (PSL). He was drafted 17th overall in the 2013 PBA draft by the Tropang Texters. He has played in multiple basketball leagues such as the ASEAN Basketball League (ABL), Maharlika Pilipinas Basketball League (MPBL), and  Pilipinas Super League (PSL).

College career 
Celiz first played for Rizal Technological University. He didn't think that he would be playing basketball after college. His team won the silver medal in the 2009 Penang Unity Chief Basketball Minister Friendship Cup, with him scoring 31 points with eight threes in the final game of the tournament.

He was then discovered by Eric Altamirano, the coach of the NU Bulldogs at the time. He only played one season there.

Professional career

Talk 'n Text Tropang Texters 
Celiz was selected 17th overall in the 2013 PBA draft by Talk 'n Text. His team made the Finals in the 2014 Commissioner's Cup. However, they lost to the San Mig Coffee Mixers, 3–1, despite going on a 13-game winning streak before the Finals. He was left unprotected for the expansion draft.

Blackwater Elite 
Celiz was then drafted by the Blackwater Elite in the expansion draft. He scored 11 points in a loss to the NLEX Road Warriors in the 2014–15 Philippine Cup. They had no wins that conference.

Alab Pilipinas 
Celiz then joined other ex-PBA players such as Jeric Fortuna and JR Cawaling among others in playing for Alab Pilipinas. After struggling in his first few games, he found his stroke when he finished with 14 points on 4-of-7 shooting from three in Alab's 87–79 win over the Westports Malaysia Dragons.

Two days later, Celiz played his best game for Alab when he scored 23 points in a 79–77 road loss to Malaysia He scored 17 points on 8-of-14 shooting to lead the locals in a win over the Hong Kong Eastern Long Lions.

GlobalPort Batang Pier 
After his stint with Alab and spending time in the PBA D-League, Celiz signed a deal with the GlobalPort Batang Pier for the rest of the 2017 Governors' Cup.

Return to ABL 
Celiz, along with Ray Parks Jr., and Lawrence Domingo, returned to Alab. His team won the 2017–18 title over the Mono Vampire.

Bataan Risers 
Celiz, along with Alab teammate Pamboy Raymundo, joined the Bataan Risers. In Bataan's 95–85 win over the Imus Bandera, he scored 15 points while hauling down seven rebounds and dishing three assists. His team went on to finish with a league-best 23–2 record. They beat the Caloocan Supremos in the quarterfinals, but lost to the Manila Stars in three games.

GenSan Warriors 
Celiz then joined the GenSan Warriors the following season. He scored a career-high 27 points in an upset win over the previously unbeaten San Juan Knights. He then had 26 points (including the game-winner) in a close win over Imus. In a game against the Pasay Voyagers, he went on a personal 9–0 run which helped GenSan take control of the game and win after trailing for most of that game. He finished that game with 17 points, 11 rebounds, and five assists. In their final game of the regular season, he contributed 23 points and 16 rebounds as the Warriors ended with the 7th seed. Before the playoffs, he contributed 12 points and five rebounds in the South All-Stars' overtime win over the North. He led his team in scoring in both of their playoff games against the Bacoor City Strikers but they still lost.

Davao Occidental Tigers 
In 2021, Celiz was signed by the Davao Occidental Tigers, his third team in the MPBL. During the FilBasket Subic Championship, he almost had a triple-double with 26 points, 14 rebounds and nine assists with three blocks in a double-overtime win over the San Juan Knights. He scored 10 points to help Davao get to the semifinals over Burlington EOG Sports. The Tigers then moved to the PSL.

In the inaugural game of the Pilipinas Super League (PSL), Celiz led his team with a stat line of 16 points, 10 rebounds, and three blocks in a win over the Roxas Vanguards. He then had 20 points, 6 rebounds, 4 assists and 3 blocks in a win over the Cagayan Valley Golden Eagles.

He was set to play for them once again as the rebranded Davao Pilipinas were originally picked to represent the Philippines in the ASEAN Basketball League (ABL). However, those plans fell through and the Zamboanga Valientes became the new Philippine representatives for the ABL.

Career statistics

College

PBA

National team career 
In 2013, Celiz, along with Kevin Ferrer, Bacon Austria, and Gio Ciriacruz, represented the Philippines in the 2013 FIBA Asia 3x3 Championship.

References

External links 

1988 births
Living people
Basketball players from Negros Occidental
Blackwater Bossing players
Filipino men's basketball players
NorthPort Batang Pier players
Maharlika Pilipinas Basketball League players
Shooting guards
Small forwards
San Miguel Alab Pilipinas players
TNT Tropang Giga players
NU Bulldogs basketball players
TNT Tropang Giga draft picks
Philippines national 3x3 basketball team players
Filipino men's 3x3 basketball players